Jerdonia may refer to:
Jerdonia indica, a species of plant in the family Gesneriaceae
Jerdonia (gastropod), a genus of tropical land snails in the family Cyclophoridae